This was the first edition of the women's event.

Ulrikke Eikeri and Ellen Perez won the title, defeating Lyudmyla Kichenok and Marta Kostyuk in the final, 6–3, 6–3.

Seeds

Draw

Draw

References

External Links
Draw

Tenerife Ladies Open - Singles